Vecdole Castle is a castle on the Daugava River in the historical region of Vidzeme, Latvia. Built before 1226, today only ruins remain.

See also
List of castles in Latvia

References

External links
 
 Vecdole Castle
 

Castles in Latvia